The eleventh series of the children's television series Hi-5 aired between 31 August 2009 and 30 October 2009 on the Nine Network in Australia. The series was produced by Southern Star and Nine with Noel Price as executive producer. 

This was the first series to be produced by Southern Star, taking over from Kids Like Us. It was also the first series to feature Lauren Brant, Casey Burgess, Fely Irvine and Tim Maddren, and the first series that did not feature any original cast members. The new line-up was known as a "new generation" of Hi-5.

Production
The Hi-5 franchise was sold by Kids Like Us (the joint company of the program's creators, Helena Harris and Posie Graeme-Evans) in March 2008, to the Nine Network and production company Southern Star. Harris and Graeme-Evans ended their involvement with the production of Hi-5, and the brand was placed under the direction of Nine and Southern Star executives, Martin Hersov and Cathy Payne. Along with the change of ownership, cast members Kellie Crawford, Nathan Foley and Sun Park left the group in late 2008. In December, it was alleged by News.com.au's Confidential reporter that Crawford and Foley had been asked to leave, and that the company were "opting to recruit younger, cheaper performers." However, Park denied the industry rumours.

The new members of Hi-5, Lauren Brant, Fely Irvine and Tim Maddren, were revealed in February 2009 after auditioning in late 2008 and beginning work in January. The trio joined established members Stevie Nicholson and Casey Burgess to form the "new generation" of the group. Along with the cast announcement, Nine committed to five new series featuring the new generation group, which would air through to 2013. However, only three of these planned series were produced. The eleventh series began production in early 2009, becoming the first series produced under Southern Star. The Song of the Week segments were filmed at Silk Studios in Willoughby, with the rest filmed at ABC Studios.

Noel Price from Southern Star, who had over a decade of experience in children's television, was assigned as the executive producer of the new series. Of the cast change in later years, Price explained how Hi-5 was designed so that its popularity would not rely solely on the cast members' individual appeal. Despite the change of cast and production company, the series retained many of the original producers and writers. Director Jonathan Geraghty explained that the brief for the series was "to rediscover the magic and excitement" that made the series such as success in its earlier years.

The eleventh series debuted on 31 August 2009. Hersov and Payne said "we're very excited to be launching the next phase of Hi-5".

Cast

Presenters
 Lauren Brant – Body Move
 Casey Burgess – Word Play
 Fely Irvine – Puzzles and Patterns
 Tim Maddren – Making Music
 Stevie Nicholson – Shapes in Space

Episodes

Home video releases

Awards and nominations

References

External links
 Hi-5 Website

2009 Australian television seasons